Kevin Gagné (born April 14, 1992) is a Canadian professional ice hockey defenceman. He is currently an unrestricted free agent, who most recently played with the Kölner Haie of the Deutsche Eishockey Liga (DEL).

Playing career
Gagné was rated as a top prospect who played the majority of the 2012–13 season in the Quebec Major Junior Hockey League (QMJHL). Gagné was rewarded for his outstanding play during the 2012–13 QMJHL season by winning the Emile Bouchard Trophy as the league's top defenceman, and also being named to the QMJHL's First All-Star Team.

After two seasons with the Ducks American Hockey League affiliate, the Norfolk Admirals, Gagne was loaned for the last season of his entry-level contract to Sweden, agreeing to terms with Mora IK of the second division on November 2, 2015.

Following Mora IK's relegation from the SHL in the 2018–19 season, Gagné left to sign a one-year contract with German outfit, Kölner Haie of the Deutsche Eishockey Liga (DEL), on May 24, 2019.

Awards and honours

References

External links 

1992 births
Acadian people
Canadian expatriate ice hockey players in Sweden
Canadian ice hockey defencemen
Ice hockey people from New Brunswick
Kölner Haie players
Living people
Mora IK players
Norfolk Admirals players
People from Edmundston
Rimouski Océanic players
Rögle BK players
Saint John Sea Dogs players